SPTC may refer to:
 Shanghai public transport card
 Sheffield Pupil Teacher Centre
 Southern Pacific Transportation Company
 St Paul's Theological Centre
 formerly Swaziland Posts and Telecommunications Corporation, now Eswatini Posts and Telecommunications Corporation (EPTC)